Nanquan Puyuan (Chinese: 南泉普願; Wade-Giles: Nan-ch’üan P’u-yüan; Pinyin: Nánquán Pǔyuàn; Japanese: Nansen Fugan; Korean: 남천보원 Nam-cheon Bo-won) (c. 749 – c. 835) was a Chán (Zen) Buddhist master in China during the Tang dynasty. He was the student and Dharma successor of the Master Mazu Daoyi (709–788).

Biography
In the year 795, after his enlightenment experience under Mǎzŭ, he settled in a self-made hut on Mount Nanquan, from which his dharma name is derived, and lived there in eremitic solitude for three decades.   In time, monks persuaded him to come down the mountain and found a monastery; from that time forward, he always had hundreds of students.

Appearance in koans
Nanquan appears in several koans:
 4 koans in The Gateless Gate (#14, #19, #27, #34), 
 6 koans in the Blue Cliff Record (#28, #31, #40, #63, #64, #69), and 
 3 koans in The Book of Equanimity (#9, #69, #91).

Two koans from the Blue Cliff Record (#28 & #69) depict Nanquan as an advanced student interacting with fellow students of Mǎzŭ, and the others depict him as a teacher in his own right.

A well-known koan is case #14 of the Gateless Gate, "Nansen kills the cat":

Influence
Nánquán had seventeen Dharma successors, the most famous of whom was Zhàozhōu Cōngshěn (778–897). Case #19 of the Gateless Gate recounts an interaction between Nánquán and Zhàozhōu that led to the latter having a profound realization; some translators/editors, for example Paul Reps, interpret this as Zhàozhōu's enlightenment moment.

References

Chinese Zen Buddhists
740s births
835 deaths